Acianthera wageneriana is a species of orchid plant native to Bolivia, Brazil South, Colombia, Ecuador, Peru, Venezuela.

References 

wageneriana
Flora of Bolivia
Flora of Brazil
Flora of Colombia
Flora of Ecuador
Flora of Peru
Flora of Venezuela